"Race My Mind" is a song by Canadian rapper Drake. Released on September 3, 2021, as the fifteenth track from Drake's sixth studio album Certified Lover Boy.

Composition
"Race My Mind" contains samples of "Dead Wrong", written by Christopher Wallace and Osten Harvey, as performed by The Notorious B.I.G., as well as samples of Sun Ra's recording and composition "Rumpelstiltskin" and "The Signs Part IV" by David Axelrod. It also interpolates lyrics from "Give It to Me Baby" by Rick James.

Charts

Year-end charts

References

2021 songs
Drake (musician) songs
Songs written by Drake (musician)
Songs written by 40 (record producer)
Songs written by the Notorious B.I.G.
Songs written by Rick James